Kiyekbayevo (Keyekbay) is a rural locality (a village) and the administrative centre of Kiyekbayevsky Selsoviet, Burzyansky District, Bashkortostan, Russia. The population was 296 as of 2010. There are 4 streets.

Geography 
Kiyekbayevo is located 18 km southwest of Starosubkhangulovo (the district's administrative centre) by road. Mindigulovo is the nearest rural locality.

References 

Rural localities in Burzyansky District